Carib may refer to:

People and languages
Kalina people, or Caribs, an indigenous people of South America
Carib language, also known as Kalina, the language of the South American Caribs
Kalinago people, or Island Caribs, an indigenous people of the Lesser Antilles in the Caribbean
Island Carib language, or simply Carib, the language of the Island Caribs
Cariban languages, the wider family of languages that includes Carib (but not Island Carib)
Black Carib, indigenous people from the island of Saint Vincent, descended from Island Caribs and black slaves
Garifuna people, Central American people descended from Saint Vincent's Black Caribs

Birds
Eulampis, a genus of hummingbird with the following species:
Green-throated carib 
Purple-throated carib
Carib grackle, a New World tropical blackbird

Other uses
Carib Aviation, a former airline based in Antigua and Barbuda
Carib Brewery, a brewery headquartered in Trinidad and Tobago
Carib Territory, a district in the Caribbean island-nation of Dominica
Caribes de Anzoátegui, a professional baseball team from Puerto la Cruz, Venezuela
, several United States Navy vessels

See also

Cari (disambiguation)
Carob
Caribbean (disambiguation)

Language and nationality disambiguation pages